Splendrillia kingmai is a species of sea snail, a marine gastropod mollusk in the family Drilliidae.

This species is also described as a fossil.

Description

Distribution
This marine species is endemic to New Zealand and occurs off Ninety Mile Beach, North Island

References

 Marwick, John. Upper Cenozoic Mollusca of Wairoa District, Hawkeś Bay. New Zealand Department of Scientific and Industrial Research, New Zealand Geological Survey, 1965.
 Beu, A.G. 1979: Bathyal Nukumaruan mollusca from Oaro, southern Marlborough, New Zealand, New Zealand Journal of Geology and Geophysics, 22(1) (p. 99)

External links
 Spencer H.G., Willan R.C., Marshall B.A. & Murray T.J. (2011). Checklist of the Recent Mollusca Recorded from the New Zealand Exclusive Economic Zone

kingmai
Gastropods of New Zealand
Gastropods described in 1965